The following is a list of presidents of FK Vardar.

Presidents

References

External links
 List of presidents at the Vardar official website 

Presidents
Vardar Presidents